The bidding process for UEFA Euro 2004 ended on 11 October 1999 in Aachen, Germany when Portugal was selected as the host, beating out Spain and the joint bid of Austria and Hungary.

History
By October 1999, only three bids left to fight for earning the right to host Euro 2004:
 Portugal
  Austria–Hungary (joint bid)
 Spain

The UEFA Executive Committee voted on the bids on 12 October 1999, and chose Portugal as the winning bid.

Bids

Portugal
The bid was launched on 1 June 1998. The proposed venues for the bid were the following:

Lisbon – Estádio da Luz
Lisbon – Estádio José Alvalade
Porto – Estádio do Dragão
Porto – Estádio do Bessa
Braga – Estádio Municipal de Braga
Aveiro – Estádio Municipal de Aveiro
Coimbra – Estádio Cidade de Coimbra
Guimarães – Estádio D. Afonso Henriques
Leiria – Estádio Dr. Magalhães Pessoa
Faro/Loulé – Estádio Algarve

Spain
The bid was launched on 8 November 1996. The proposed venues for the bid were the following:

Madrid – Santiago Bernabéu
Madrid – Vicente Calderón
Barcelona – Camp Nou
Barcelona – Montjuic Olympic Stadium
Valencia – Mestalla
Sevilla – La Cartuja
Bilbao – San Mames
A Coruña – Riazor
Zaragoza – La Romareda
Vigo – Balaídos
Palma de Mallorca – Son Moix
San Sebastian – Anoeta
Valladolid – Jose Zorrilla
Granada – New Los Carmenes
Oviedo – New Tartiere

Austria–Hungary
The bid was launched in June 1997. The proposed venues for the bid were the following:

 Austria
Vienna – Ernst Happel Stadium
Salzburg – Salzburg-Wals Stadium
Innsbruck – Tivoli Stadium
Graz – Arnold Schwarzenegger Stadium
St. Pölten – Niederosterreich Arena
 Hungary
Budapest – Nép Stadium
Budapest – Ferencváros Stadium
Debrecen – Nagyerdei Stadion
Székesfehérvár – Sóstói Stadion
Győr – Rába Eto Stadium

References

Bids
UEFA European Championship bids